Teniente Jorge Henrich Arauz Airport  is an airport serving the city of Trinidad, Bolivia.
It is the main airport and gateway to the Bolivian section of the Amazon basin.

The Trinidad non-directional beacon (Ident: TDD) is located on the field.

Airlines and destinations

Accidents and incidents
On 19 April 1968, Douglas VC-47D CP-734 of Lloyd Aéreo Boliviano crashed on take-off.
On 1 February 2008, Boeing 727 CP-2429 of Lloyd Aéreo Boliviano landed 4.2 km short of the runway due to fuel exhaustion.
On 6 September 2011, Aerocon Flight 238, operated by Swearingen SA.227BC Metroliner III CP-2548 crashed on approach, killing eight of the nine people on board.

See also
Transport in Bolivia
List of airports in Bolivia

References

External links
Trinidad Airport at OpenStreetMap
Trinidad Airport at OurAirports

Airports in Beni Department
Trinidad, Bolivia